Yahl is a south-eastern suburb of Mount Gambier

The area around present day Yahl were inhabited by the local Bungandidj people. Yahl is the aboriginal word for "waters, much water".

The following have been listed as state heritage places on the South Australian Heritage Register – the Former Oast House and Attached Stone Building and the German style cottage.

The 2016 Australian census which was conducted in August 2016 reports that Yahl had a population of 855 of which 224 lived in its town centre.

Yahl is located within the federal division of Barker, the state electoral district of Mount Gambier and the local government area of the District Council of Grant. It is also part of Mount Gambier’s urban sprawl.

References

Towns in South Australia
Limestone Coast